Mary E. Panzer (September 19, 1951) is an American banker and politician.  A Republican, she served 25 years in the Wisconsin Legislature, including 11 years in the Wisconsin State Senate (1993–2005) and 14 years in the State Assembly (1980–1993).  Her father, Frank E. Panzer, was also a member of the Wisconsin State Senate.

Biography

Born in Waupun, Wisconsin, Panzer was educated at the University of Wisconsin–Madison, after which she was a banker and worked in the Wisconsin State Legislature.

In 1980, Panzer was elected to the Wisconsin State Assembly in a special election to replace fellow Republican James R. Lewis (who had been convicted of perjury). (She had almost defeated then-incumbent Lewis in the 1974 Republican primary.) She served until 1993, when she was elected to the Wisconsin State Senate in another special election.  Panzer eventually rose to be the majority leader of the senate.

In the Republican primary election in September 2004, Panzer was herself defeated for renomination by her successor in the state assembly, Glenn Grothman, who alleged that she was not sufficiently conservative for the modern-day Republican Party. Grothman won with a vote of 79% to 21% for Panzer.

References

External links
 
 20th Senate District, Senator Panzer in the Wisconsin Blue Book (2003–2004)

|-

|-

|-

|-

1951 births
American bankers
Living people
Members of the Wisconsin State Assembly
People from Waupun, Wisconsin
Wisconsin state senators
Women state legislators in Wisconsin
American women bankers
University of Wisconsin–Madison alumni
21st-century American politicians
21st-century American women politicians